The Matterhorn is a peak on Roa Ridge in the Asgard Range of Victoria Land, Antarctica. It was so named by Griffith Taylor of the British Antarctic Expedition under Robert Falcon Scott, 1910–13, because of its resemblance to the Matterhorn, the famous Swiss mountain.

It is bounded by the lower margins of Matterhorn Glacier, Lacroix Glacier, and the northern wall of Taylor Valley. It was named by the New Zealand Geographic Board in 1998 after Iain Campbell, New Zealand Soil Bureau, whose Antarctic research from 1964 spanned over 30 years.

References

Mountains of the Asgard Range
McMurdo Dry Valleys